Prince Philippe of Belgium, Count of Flanders (24 March 1837 – 17 November 1905), was the third born and second surviving son of King Leopold I of Belgium and Louise d'Orléans. He was the  brother of Leopold II of Belgium and Empress Carlota of Mexico.

Born at the Château de Laeken, near Brussels, Belgium, Philippe was created Count of Flanders on 14 December 1840. In January 1869, upon the sudden death of his nephew Prince Leopold, Duke of Brabant, he became heir presumptive to the Belgian throne. In 1866, after the abdication of Alexandru Ioan Cuza, Prince of Romania, Philippe refused being named the new Romanian sovereign, and the throne was later accepted by Philippe's brother-in-law Carol I. Earlier, he had also refused the crown of Greece, which was offered to him in 1862.

Philippe died in 1905. When his brother King Leopold II died in 1909, Philippe's second son ascended the Belgian throne as King Albert I.

Marriage and issue
On 25 April 1867 at St. Hedwig's Cathedral in Berlin, he married Marie Luise Alexandra Caroline, Princess of Hohenzollern-Sigmaringen, (1845–1912), daughter of Karl Anton von Hohenzollern (1811–1885) and his wife Josephine of Baden (1813–1900). Among Marie's siblings were the deceased Queen of Portugal and the future King of Romania.

The children of Phillipe and Marie were:
Prince Baudouin (3 June 1869 – 23 January 1891); he died of influenza at the age of 21.
Princess Henriette (30 November 1870 – 28 March 1948); she married Prince Emmanuel, Duke of Vendôme on 12 February 1896. They had four children.
Princess Joséphine Marie (30 November 1870 – 18 January 1871), twin to Princess Henriette.
Princess Joséphine Caroline (18 October 1872 – 6 January 1958); she married Prince Karl Anton of Hohenzollern on 28 May 1894. They had four children.
King Albert I (8 April 1875 – 17 February 1934); he married Duchess Elisabeth in Bavaria on 2 October 1900. They had three children.

He died in his residence the Palace of the Count of Flanders, and is buried at the Church of Our Lady of Laeken. He was succeeded as heir presumptive to the throne by his son, Albert.

Honours 
He received the following decorations and awards:
Domestic
 Grand Cordon of the Order of Leopold (civil), 24 March 1855
Foreign

Arms

Ancestry

Notes

References
Weintraub, Stanley, Uncrowned King: The Life of Prince Albert, The Free Press, New York, 1997, p. 458.
Willis, Daniel (also known as Daniel A. Brewer-Ward), The Descendants of Louis XIII, Clearfield Co., Inc., Baltimore, Maryland, 1999, p. 99.
NEXUS Jan/Feb 1998, Vol. XV, No. 1, p. 32.

Literature
Damien Bilteryst, Philippe Comte de Flandre, Frère de Léopold II, Bruxelles, Editions Racine, juin 2014, 336 p.

External links

1837 births
1905 deaths
Princes of Saxe-Coburg and Gotha
House of Saxe-Coburg and Gotha (Belgium)
People from Laeken
Burials at the Church of Our Lady of Laeken
Grand Crosses of the Order of Saint Stephen of Hungary
Grand Croix of the Légion d'honneur
Knights of the Holy Sepulchre
Recipients of the Order of the Netherlands Lion
Recipients of the Order of the White Eagle (Russia)
Recipients of the Order of St. Anna, 1st class
Knights of the Golden Fleece of Spain
Sons of kings
Non-inheriting heirs presumptive